Maxim Hugo Malins (born 7 January 1997) is an English professional rugby union player who primarily plays wing for Saracens in the Gallagher Premiership. He has also represented England at international level, having made his test debut against Georgia during the Autumn Nations Cup. Malins has previously played for clubs such as Bristol Bears in the past.

Early life and education
Malins' first participation in rugby was at his local rugby club, Saffron Walden, aged 6. His rugby then moved to his new club, Bishop's Stortford RFC, where he remained playing until the age of 16.  While at Bishop's Stortford he participated in the winning of 7 age-group tournaments.

Malins attended Felsted School from a young age, and his rugby highlights included reaching the final of the NatWest Schools Cup U18 Vase. While playing a school game for Felsted he was identified by Saracens' scout Matt Davies, before being invited to join the Saracens junior academy at 17. Whilst at school Malins was also a promising cricketer and field hockey player, representing the school 1st XI at both sports from the age of 15 and top scoring in the 2014 Cape Town international Hockey Festival.

As of 2018 Malins was studying a business and finance degree at the University of Hertfordshire.

Rugby playing career

Club

Old Albanians
During his time in the Senior academy Malins held dual registration with Old Albanian. He played 19 games for them with a high scoring rate of 11 points per game. His performance during the 2015/16 season aided significantly in returning the Old Albanians to National League 1 via the play-off mechanism.

Saracens
Malins made his first team debut in January 2017, coming on as a substitute against the Scarlets in the Anglo-Welsh Cup. Since then he has played 29 games across all competitions, with a particular focus in the Anglo-Welsh and international breaks, which caused the absence of Owen Farrell and Alex Lozowski. He has scored 104 points in these games. However while his try rate (7 in 29) has been high, his place-kicking success rate has been fairly low (63%).

With reasonable success in his games in the 17/18 season, and an increased likelihood of both Saracens' first choice fly-halves missing games due to international duty, Malins was offered and accepted a two-year contract extension, to the end of the 2019/20 season. In March 2019, Malins scored all nine points for Saracens in their 9-23 defeat to the Northampton Saints in the final of the 2019 Premiership Rugby Cup.

Bristol
He agreed a further contract extension which saw him join Bristol Bears on loan until the end of the 2020-21 season along with fellow teammate Ben Earl. In October 2020 Malins scored a try as Bristol defeated Toulon in the final of the European Rugby Challenge Cup. During his spell at Bristol Malins has played primarily at fullback and has a high try scoring rate of 11 tries from 11 starts (+2 appearances off the bench) as of 21/04/21.

International

U18

Malins' England Under-18 debut game occurred in February 2015, where he scored a try. He also participated in the victory against Scotland shortly afterwards. Malins was selected for the 3-month tour to South Africa by the U18 England team in the summer of 2015. The 3-month tour, as well as a number of regional games, had 3 primary games: the France U18 team and two games against South Africa U18.

U20
Malins participated, primarily at fullback, in England winning the 2016 World Rugby Under 20 Championship hosted in Manchester. He scored tries against Scotland in the pool stage and in the semi-final against South Africa. He started at full back in the final against Ireland. The following year he was a member of the squad that completed the grand slam in the 2017 Six Nations Under 20s Championship and then featured at fly-half as England reached the final of the 2017 World Rugby Under 20 Championship, before being defeated by New Zealand. He was particularly noted by England U20 head coach Ian Vass as being a major figure in their success, acting as a calmer figure around which the team could bond. He acted as the primary place-kicker in the latter competition for the majority of his games with a 72% success rate.

Senior
In October 2020 he was called up to the senior England squad by head coach Eddie Jones. On 14 November 2020 Malins made his Test debut as a second-half replacement for Ollie Lawrence in their opening fixture of the Autumn Nations Cup against Georgia. He also came off the bench in the final of that competition as England defeated France in extra-time to win the tournament.

International tries 
As of 12 February 2023

References

External links

Max Malins, Ultimate Rugby

1997 births
Living people
English rugby union players
England international rugby union players
Saracens F.C. players
Bristol Bears players
Rugby union fly-halves
Rugby union fullbacks
People educated at Felsted School
Alumni of the University of Hertfordshire
Rugby union players from Cambridge